The Ohio Civil Rights Commission is a commission of the Ohio State Government formed in 1959, whose duties are specified in Section 4112 of the Ohio Revised Code.

The Commission's primary function is to enforce state laws about discrimination, and they oversee outreach regarding such matters. It consists of a five-member board of Commissioners appointed by the state governor and approximately 90 employees.

History
Ohio Civil Rights Comm'n v. Dayton Christian Schools, Inc. was a U.S. Supreme Court case involving this commission regarding a sex discrimination case in which a ruling was made that a court had ruled on the matter in question in error without giving sufficient time for the Commission to conclude an investigation.

References

Civil Rights
State departments of civil rights of the United States